INBA or Inba may refer to:

 Chile
 Internado Nacional Barros Arana, a secondary school
 India
 Inba (film), a 2008 Tamil-language film
 Japan
 Inba, Chiba, a village
 Inba District, Chiba
 Lake Inba, a lake in Chiba Prefecture
 Mexico
 Instituto Nacional de Bellas Artes, the National Fine Arts Institute
 United States
 Illinois News Broadcasters Association
 International Natural Bodybuilding Association, a governing body in natural bodybuilding